John Broadbridge (dates of birth and death unknown) was an English cricketer.  Broadbridge's batting style is unknown.

Broadbridge made a single first-class appearance for a team of left-handed players against the Marylebone Cricket Club at Lord's Cricket Ground in 1838. In a match which the Marylebone Cricket Club won by an innings and 159 runs, Broadbridge opened the batting, with him being run out for a duck in the Left-Handed first-innings, while in their second-innings he was also run out, this time scoring 5 runs.

References

External links
John Broadbridge at ESPNcricinfo
John Broadbridge at CricketArchive

English cricketers
Left-Handed v Right-Handed cricketers